Rio Grande Valley Killer Bees may refer to:
Rio Grande Valley Killer Bees (CHL), defunct professional ice hockey team that played in the Central Hockey League
Rio Grande Valley Killer Bees (NAHL), defunct junior ice hockey team that played in the North American Hockey League
Rio Grande Valley Killer Bees (USACHL), defunct junior ice hockey team that played in the USA Central Hockey League